Father Damien, Saint Damien of Molokai, Jozef de Veuster (1840–1889), was a Belgian missionary priest who served in a leper colony on Molokai in Hawaii.

Father Damien or Father Damian may also refer to:
 Damien Karras, fictional hero of The Exorcist
 "Father Damian", alias of Damian Abraham of Fucked Up, Canadian hardcore punk band
 Father Damian, character in Song for a Raggy Boy, 2003 film, played by Alan Devlin
 Father Damián, character in El padrecito, 1964 film, played by Ángel Garasa
 Father Damian, purported previous incarnation of Chico Xavier, Brazilian medium
 Father Damian, character in The Great Heart, 1938 short film, played by Tom Neal

See also
 Pope Damian of Alexandria